|}

The Geoffrey Gilbey Handicap Chase is a National Hunt handicap chase in England which is open to horses aged five years or older. 
It is run at Newbury over a distance of 2 miles and 1 furlong (3,419 metres), and it is scheduled to take place each year in late February or early March.

The race was first run in 1970 over a distance of 2 miles 4 furlongs (4,023 metres).  The distance was increased to 3 miles (4,828 metres) for one year only (1992), before the current distance was adopted in 1993.

The race has diminished in prestige since the 1980s and is now a Class 3 Handicap.

Winners

References
Racing Post

National Hunt races in Great Britain
National Hunt chases
Newbury Racecourse